G.R.L. is an American girl group formed by Robin Antin. The group consists of members Lauren Bennett, Natasha Slayton, and Emmalyn Estrada.

The original line-up consisted of Bennett, Slayton, Estrada, Paula van Oppen, and Simone Battle. They made their debut appearance on the Smurfs 2 soundtrack with "Vacation". They would go on to appear on Pitbull's internationally successful track "Wild Wild Love", which peaked in the top 40 in the United States and top 10 in the United Kingdom, and was certified platinum by Recording Industry Association of America (RIAA). Their second single "Ugly Heart" gained international success shortly after the suicide of member Simone Battle. Leaving the group as a quartet, this inspired the group to release their next single "Lighthouse" in memory of Battle. The group disbanded shortly after its release, on June 2, 2015.

G.R.L. officially reformed on August 5, 2016, with the addition of new member Jazzy Mejia alongside Bennett and Slayton.

In October 2020, the group's original line-up briefly reformed to record new music before van Oppen announced her departure from the group on December of the same year, thus leaving the group a trio for the second time before they announced their indefinite hiatus.

History

2011–2012: Background and line-up changes
In March 2011, Antin began holding auditions to find new girls to replace the departed members of The Pussycat Dolls. The new line-up made their debut on February 5, 2012, during the Super Bowl, as part of GoDaddy's annual TV commercials, appearing with Danica Patrick. "The look of the commercial is not necessarily the new look of the group this time around," said Robin Antin, adding, "It's breathtakingly beautiful. It's a fun, real-campy kind of sexy. It's all of that, but again, what we're doing for this next life of the Pussycat Dolls, the girls are all young. It's a fresh, young energy." An official picture taken from the ad showed five members: Lauren Bennett, Paula van Oppen, Vanessa Curry, Chrystina Sayers, and Erica Kiehl Jenkins.

On April 13, 2012, it was announced that Chrystina Sayers was no longer a part of the new line-up. In July 2012, the line-up was announced consisting of Bennett and Van Oppen, with new members Natalie Mejia, Amanda Branche, and Natasha Slayton, thus confirming Jenkins and Curry's withdrawal from the group. In August 2012, publicity photos showed the "new" line-up including Simone Battle (from Season one of The X Factor USA) replacing Branche. In November 2012, it was revealed, through the hiring of Emmalyn Estrada, that Mejia was no longer part of the group, thus creating the official lineup of G.R.L. Mejia announced that she was expecting her first child with her husband, and due to her situation she made a choice to not continue with the group.

2013–2014: Mainstream success, G.R.L. and Battle's death

In February 2013, Antin officially announced that the girls will be making their debut as a brand-new group with a different name instead of replacing the departed members of the Pussycat Dolls. The group was officially unveiled at Chateau Marmont in April. On June 16, the group released their debut single, "Vacation", which was included on the soundtrack for the animated movie The Smurfs 2 as a B-side to Britney Spears' "Ooh La La". The song made its official debut on a national chart on the South Korea Gaon International Chart at number ninety-seven. On September 10, 2013, in Brooklyn, New York, the group began a monthlong promotional tour partnered with Claire's and Westfield Malls meeting fans, visiting radio stations, and performing at select locations. The group's collaboration with rapper Pitbull on the lead single, "Wild Wild Love" off his album Globalization, became successful internationally. The single peaked at number thirty on the Billboard Hot 100 chart, selling 767,000 copies in the U.S. as of March 2015. The song made the top ten in Australia, Belgium, Indonesia, Norway, United Kingdom, including certified platinum in Australia and Canada.

Not long after their formation they announced they had begun recording for their debut studio album, with songwriters and record producers Dr. Luke, Max Martin, Cirkut, Darkchild, and Lukas Hilbert. However, the album was scrapped in favor of a self-titled EP instead. The lead single off the EP, "Ugly Heart", debuted in the ARIA Singles Chart at forty-one, before peaking in the top ten at number 2, becoming the group's most successful single to date, being certified 4× platinum by Australian Recording Industry Association (ARIA). The song peaked at number ten on The Australian 2014 Year End charts, certifying platinum. The track reached a peak position of number 3 on the Official New Zealand Music Chart.

On September 5, 2014, Battle was found dead in her West Hollywood home. Los Angeles County Coroner's Lieutenant Fred Corral ruled the death a suicide, following an autopsy. The next day, the group released a statement via Twitter, saying, "Words cannot express the depth of our loss. Simone's incredible talent was only surpassed by the size of her heart." In a following tweet, they said "We will carry her memory with us in everything we do."

2015: Lighthouse, G.R.L. Gives an Hour and hiatus

The group released their first single since Battle's death, "Lighthouse". Along with the single, the group announced a new campaign with Give an Hour called G.R.L. Gives an Hour, which was dedicated to raise awareness about mental health issues in America. G.R.L. Gives an Hour later became an associate campaign of Michelle Obama's Change Direction. "Lighthouse" peaked at number thirty on the ARIA Singles Chart in Australia, number eighteen on the New Zealand singles chart, number 55 on the UK Singles Chart, number 35 on the sales-only based version of the chart and at number 24 on the Scottish Singles Chart.

On March 10, 2015, it was revealed by the band during their performance on Australian breakfast television program Sunrise while in Hawaii that they would be the opening act for Meghan Trainor on the Australian leg of her That Bass Tour where they performed on April 27 and April 30.

The group officially disbanded on 2 June 2015 through a joint statement from RCA Records, Kemosabe Records, Larry Rudolph, and Robin Antin, stating "Nearly 9 months following the tragic death of band member Simone Battle, girl group G.R.L. announces today that they are disbanding. We wish them continued success in each of their next creative endeavors."

2016–2020: Reformation
In June 2016, the group's new rep, Matt Wynter, stated that the girls are back via Loco Talent's website. G.R.L.'s new single is expected to be released in the summer.

On August 5, 2016, it was announced that Jazzy Mejia was added as the third member of G.R.L. alongside Bennett and Slayton, making the group officially a trio. The newly reformed G.R.L. headlined the Australian music festival Nickelodeon Slimefest in September 2016.

On August 28, 2016, the trio released their first promotional single together, "Kiss Myself". The single "Are We Good" was released on December 9, with a music video released on January 26, 2017.

In May 2018, Jazzy Mejia confirmed on Twitter that G.R.L. would be going on tour. Dates were announced for February 2019 in Australia alongside S Club 3, Big Brovaz and 5ive, but it was later confirmed that G.R.L. would not be performing on the tour. They stated on Twitter that they hope to tour soon.

In 2020, Mejia's withdrawal from the group was announced.

2020–present: Emmalyn's return and new music
In September 2020 member Natasha Slayton posted a video of herself, Lauren Bennett and former members Emmalyn Estrada and Paula van Oppen dancing to a song alongside the founder of the group, Robin Antin, on her Instagram stories. Since then, fans started speculating that the group was reforming alongside member Jazzy Mejia. Later in October of the same year, Slayton, Estrada and van Oppen started posting TikTok videos with each other, making the rumors of the group reforming increase. By November 2020, posts from the group's Instagram and Twitter accounts during the time Mejia was a member of the group were unexpectedly deleted, a new profile picture with the group's logo was added. During the same month, a TikTok account by the group's name was made, posting clips from the music videos by the original line-up of the group.

On December 10, 2020, a few clips and pictures from what seemed to look like the set from the group's next music video were posted by Bennett, Estrada and Slayton. The fans immediately noticed the absence of van Oppen. Later that day, the group's manager, Matt Ziedman, announced that van Oppen had decided not to rejoin the group. van Oppen also explained why she decided not to reform with the rest of the group on an Instagram post.

In January 2021, a few clips from what was rumored to be the group's next music video were posted to the group's Instagram, TikTok and Twitter accounts, the clips in fact were the members dancing and singing along to a medley of the group's singles. Later in the same month, the group did an Instagram live alongside Antin and Ziedman confirming their return and future new music. They also explained why Mejia was not invited to said return by saying that Estrada, van Oppen and management were only interested in reforming the group's original line-up.

By April 2021, Ziedman, the group's manager, responded to a fan of the group on Twitter explaining that he was not "involved" with the group's return anymore.

Artistry
G.R.L. is a pop, teen pop and R&B girl group.

Members timeline

Discography

G.R.L. (2014)

Tours
Supporting
 That Bass Tour (for Meghan Trainor; 2015)

Notes

References

External links

Musical groups established in 2013
Musical groups disestablished in 2015
Musical groups reestablished in 2016
American girl groups
American pop girl groups
American pop music groups
RCA Records artists
American musical duos
Musical trios
2013 establishments in California